Forever Rich is a 2021 Dutch film directed by Shady El-Hamus, written by Shady El-Hamus and Jeroen Scholten van Aschat and starring Yootha Wong-Loi-Sing, Hadewych Minis and Jonas Smulders. It was released on October 1, 2021, by Netflix.

Cast 
 Yootha Wong-Loi-Sing as Jessica
 Hadewych Minis as Els
 Jonas Smulders as Richie
 Matteo van der Grijn		
 Sinem Kavus as Anna
 Mustafa Duygulu as Abdel
 Andrew Tate as White Mask
 Daniël Kolf as Tony
 Simon van Lammeren
 Zoë

References

External links 
 
 

2021 films
Dutch crime comedy films
Dutch-language Netflix original films
2020s Dutch-language films
Dutch crime drama films
Dutch comedy-drama films